There are many Grade I listed buildings in St Edmundsbury, a former non-metropolitan district and borough in the county of Suffolk in England that takes its name from the town of Bury St Edmunds.

In the United Kingdom, the term listed building refers to a building or other structure officially designated as being of "exceptional architectural or historic special interest"; Grade I structures are those considered to be "buildings of "exceptional interest, sometimes considered to be internationally important. Just 2.5% of listed buildings are Grade I." The total number of listed buildings in England is 372,905. Listing was begun by a provision in the Town and Country Planning Act 1947. Listing a building imposes severe restrictions on what the owner might wish to change or modify in the structure or its fittings. In England, the authority for listing under the Planning (Listed Buildings and Conservation Areas) Act 1990 rests with English Heritage, a non-departmental public body sponsored by the Department for Culture, Media and Sport.

St Edmundsbury is a local government district with its administrative headquarters at Bury St Edmunds, which is the third city by size in Suffolk. The other towns in the area are Clare and Haverhill.  The number of inhabitants of the area is 102,900 with a density of 157 inhabitants per km2. The whole district is parished.

List

|}

See also
List of Grade I listed buildings in Suffolk

Notes

References

External links

St Edmundsbury